Duelo de Pasiones (English: Duel of Passions) is a Mexican telenovela produced by Juan Osorio for Televisa. The telenovela based on radionovela Flor del Campo. It premiered on April 17, 2006 and ended on October 27, 2006.

Erika Buenfil, Ludwika Paleta and Pablo Montero starred as protagonists, while Sergio Goyri, Fabiola Campomanes, Alejandro Ávila and Rafael Rojas starred as antagonists. Zaide Silvia Gutiérrez and Ana Martin starred as stellar performances.

Plot
Álvaro Montellano receives a letter addressed for his wife and written by his farmhand, José Gómez. Upon reading it he thinks his wife is in love with the farmhand and was planning to run away. In reality, the letter was meant for his sister Mariana Montellano, who loves José and even has a daughter with him, but Alfonsina, who is still in love with Álvaro, intercepted it and made him believe it was for his wife. Álvaro suffers from a disease called celotipia, caused by a traumatic experience as a child when his father committed suicide after learning his wife had cheated on him with their farmhand.

Consumed by jealousy and hatred toward his wife and her affair, he shuns her and their daughter, Alina, and exiles his wife to another, Sierra Escondida, where she continues to suffer his abuse and humiliation. Believing Alina to be the result of this liaison and not his daughter, Álvaro threatens the life of Alina's mother and forces Alina to live in a cave, leaving her in the care of the local healer, Luba and her son Gaspar, while Soledad. Here, Alina becomes known by the name of 'Flor del Campo'.

To make matters worse, before being taken away by her father, Alina had met Emilio Valtierra, a military officer, at a party. They both had fallen in love and had promised to meet each other in a cafe, a date which Alina never made. His girlfriend, Thelma, looking for Emilio, falls prey to Gaspar, and in a drunken frenzy sleeps with him. Thelma makes Emilio believe she is carrying his child, and he accepts staying with her.

Two years pass and Emilio still believes Alina left him. When he is assigned to a mission on Sierra Escondida, he meets Flor del Campo, and does not recognize her as Alina, due to her simple dress.  Álvaro, wanting Alina to suffer, makes Emilio believe she died in an accident. Emilio believes him, and as soon as he sees Flor del Campo (really Alina), he thinks its Álvaro's illegitimate daughter and initially makes her suffer because of what Alina did to him. Pretty soon the couple engages in a Duel of Pasions as they try to fight for their love even though others stand in their way.

Later, Emilio learns that Flor is really Alina after Alina goes into his house to get back her heart necklace which was the one he had given her at the beginning of the story.  He tries to take her but she refuses to let him help after being threatened by her father saying that he will kill her mother.

Cast

Main
Erika Buenfil as Soledad Fuentes Montellano
Ludwika Paleta as Alina Montellano Fuentes/Flor del Campo
Pablo Montero as Emilio Valtierra Beltrán
Sergio Goyri as Álvaro Montellano
Fabiola Campomanes as Thelma Castelo de Valtierra
Ana Martín as Luba López
Rafael Rojas as Máximo Valtierra
Alejandro Avila as Orlando Villaseñor

Supporting
 
Rene Gomez as Gaspar López
José María Torre as Ángel Valtierra Beltrán
Jorge de Silva as José Gómez
Liz Vega as Coral
Alejandra Procuna as Mariana Montellano de Gómez
Joana Brito as Adela
Ana Brenda Contreras as Claudia
Andrew Jacobson as El Jefe
Tania Vazquez as Carla Sánchez
David Ostrosky as Elías Bernal
Isaura Espinoza as Blanca de Bernal
Aída Pierce as Rebeca Castelo
Eduardo Rivera as Hugo Torres
Ximena Herrera as Rosa de Valtierra
Rafael Hernán as Santos Valtierra García
Zaide Silvia Gutiérrez as Vera
Luis Uribe as Jaime
Rafael Valderrama as Granillo
Fernando Robles as Braulio
Jaime Lozano as Rutilio
Carlos Ignacio as Padre Cristobal
Luis Reynoso as Arcadio
Mariana Ríos as Dr. Aída Cortés
Theo Tapia as Dr. Vásquez
Rafael del Villar as Dr. Ricardo Fonseca
Alicia Villareal as Raquel
Humberto Elizondo as Lic. Mauro Peña
Patricia Martínez as Malena
Xavier Ortíz as Rodrigo Ochoa
Ricardo Vera as General Ochoa
Juan Verduzco as Vargas
Nashla Aguilar as Gaby
Flor Procuna as Tina

Awards

References

External links
 at esmas.com 

2006 telenovelas
Mexican telenovelas
2006 Mexican television series debuts
2006 Mexican television series endings
Spanish-language telenovelas
Television shows set in Veracruz
Televisa telenovelas